John Arthur Gellatly (July 6, 1869 – July 6, 1963) was an American Republican politician from the U.S. state of Washington.  He served as the tenth Lieutenant Governor of Washington and four-term mayor of Wenatchee, Washington.

Gellatly and his family arrived in Wenatchee on October 1, 1900, to start over from a bankruptcy in Benton County, Oregon.  Gellatly, who served two terms (four years) as Benton County Recorder (Auditor), was offered the job of Deputy Auditor of Chelan County, Washington.  Among the public offices he held in Wenatchee were County Auditor, City Councilman, president of the Chamber of Commerce, manager of the Wenatchee Reclamation District, and four terms as Mayor.

In 1918, Gellatly was elected to the Washington House of Representatives where he served a single term.  He ran for Governor of Washington in 1920 and placed fifth in the race.  In 1928, he ran for and won the office of Lieutenant Governor of Washington.  In 1932, he ran for Governor and lost to Clarence D. Martin.  In 1958, he published a book entitled A History of Wenatchee: The Apple Capital of the World.

References

 Marshall, Maureen E. Wenatchee's Dark Past. Wenatchee, Wash: The Wenatchee World, 2008.

1869 births
1963 deaths
Lieutenant Governors of Washington (state)
Members of the Washington House of Representatives